In statistics, the observed information, or observed Fisher information, is the negative of the second derivative (the Hessian matrix) of the "log-likelihood" (the logarithm of the likelihood function). It is a sample-based version of the Fisher information.

Definition
Suppose we observe random variables , independent and identically distributed with density f(X; θ), where θ is a (possibly unknown) vector.  Then the log-likelihood of the parameters  given the data  is

.

In many instances, the observed information is evaluated at the maximum-likelihood estimate.

Alternative definition

Andrew Gelman, David Dunson and Donald Rubin define observed information instead in terms of the parameters' posterior probability, :

Fisher information
The Fisher information  is the expected value of the observed information given a single observation  distributed according to the hypothetical model with parameter :

.

Applications
In a notable article, Bradley Efron and David V. Hinkley argued that the observed information should be used in preference to the expected information when employing normal approximations for the distribution of maximum-likelihood estimates.

See also
 Fisher information matrix
 Fisher information metric

References

Information theory
Estimation theory